Cissac-Médoc is a commune in the Gironde department in Nouvelle-Aquitaine in southwestern France.

Population

See also
Château Puy Castéra
Communes of the Gironde department
Château Cissac

References

Communes of Gironde